The Mt. Carmel Cemetery is located near North 14th and Elba Streets in Lincoln, Nebraska. In 1886, Samuel and Rachel Polowsky bought property in Lincoln's Belmont section. They later sold it to the Chevra B'nai Jehuda Cemetery Association. The cemetery serves Lincoln's Orthodox and Conservative Jews.

References

External links
 
   

Geography of Lincoln, Nebraska
Jewish cemeteries in Nebraska